In this article, the results of Al Nassr Club of Saudi Arabia in 2011-2012 season is summarized.

Pre-Season preparation

New Coach

New Team Logo 

On 11 August 2011, the club's chairman Prince Faisal Bin Turki Bin Nasser showed for the first time the team's new logo. The event was held during half time of a friendly match between Al Nassr's first team and Al Nassr's U-23 team in Prince Abdulrahman Bin Saud Stadium.

New Kits 

On 4 September 2011, the club presented the 2011-12 kits for the first time. From right to left, no. 16 Fahad Al-Rashedi wearing the Home kit, no. 8 Juan Mercier wearing the Away kit and no. 4 Omar Hawsawi wearing the 3rd Kit.

Kit providers: Nike 
Sponsor(s): STC.

Sad news for the team 
On 19 August 2011, the young Al-Nassr and Saudi Arabia Olympic team striker Saud Hamood had an Anterior cruciate ligament injury when he joined the Saudi Arabian U-23 team in the Gulf Cup U-23 tournament. The surgery was successful. However, he will need 6 months before he can play any match.

The birth of Ultras Al Nassr 
Late July 2011, the idea of creating an Ultras began to invade Al-Nassr's forums and chat groups. And with the new season nearing to begin, a group of Al-Nassr's faithful fans have created "The Sun Knights" or Ultras Al-Nassr. A group that follows the team, whenever and where ever there is a match they play, to support the team's players by holding banners and singing songs. Their main nasheed is called "Faltasmot Addonia" (فلتصمت الدنيا).

Players 
All ages are calculated to September 1, 2011.

Squad information

Summer Transfers

In

Professional contract

Out

Winter Transfer

In

Professional contract

Out

Statistics

Player Stats

Disciplinary records 

Last updated on 14 November.

Competitions

Friendlies

2011 Baniyas International Tournament 
The team's captain Hussein Sulaimani was named the MVP of the tournament.

 

Baniyas International Tournament on goalzz.com.

2011–12 Saudi Professional League

Results summary

Results by round

Matches
Kickoff times are in AST (UTC+3).

2011-12 Saudi Crown Prince Cup

Matches

2012 King Cup of Champions

Matches

Quarter-finals

Semi-finals

Finals

Olympic Team (U-23) Competitions

2011-12 Saudi Federation Cup U-23

Results summary

Results by round

Matches
Kickoff times are in AST (UTC+3).

Youth Team (U-20) Competitions

2011-12 Youth League U-20

Results Summary

Results by Round
To be added when available.

Matches

Saudi Arabia Youth League 2011/2012 on goalzz.com.

2011-12 Saudi Federation Cup U-20

Group stage 
There are 3 groups. Teams who get first place in their group qualify automatically to the knockout stage along with the best second place.

Kickoff times are in AST (UTC+3).

 

From this group, Only Al Ahli qualified to the knockout stage. Al Qadisiyah and Al Ittihad qualified as the top of their groups. Hottain came as the best second place with 13 point and a +5 goal difference.
Group stage on goalzz.com.

Youngster Team (U-17) Competitions

2011-12 Youngster League U-17

Results Summary

Results by Round
To be added when available.

Matches
Kickoff times are in AST (UTC+3).

 

Saudi U-17 Premier League 2011/2012 on goalzz.com.

2011-12 Saudi Federation Cup U-17

Group stage 
There are 3 groups. Teams who get first place in their group qualify automatically to the knockout stage along with the best second place.

Kickoff times are in AST (UTC+3).

 

From this group, Only Al Nassr qualified to the knockout stage. Al Hilal and Al Ittihad qualified as the top of their groups. Al Ahli came as the best second place with 11 point.
Group stage on goalzz.com.

Knockout stage

Semi-finals 

Semi-finals round on goalzz.com.

Final 

Final round on goalzz.com.

References

Al Nassr FC seasons
Al-Nasr